John Babington Macaulay Baxter, Junior (November 4, 1924 – March 9, 2000) known as J.B.M. Baxter Jr. and Jack Baxter, was a politician in New Brunswick, Canada. He served as minister of a variety of portfolios under Premier of New Brunswick Richard Hatfield.  His father, John Babington Macaulay Baxter, was premier from 1925 to 1931. He died in Saint John in 2000.

References 

1924 births
2000 deaths
Politicians from Saint John, New Brunswick
Progressive Conservative Party of New Brunswick MLAs
Members of the Executive Council of New Brunswick
Finance ministers of New Brunswick